Three ships and one shore establishment of the British Royal Navy have been named HMS Collingwood, after Admiral Cuthbert Collingwood, 1st Baron Collingwood:
 , an 80-gun second-rate ship of the line, converted to screw propulsion in 1861, and sold in 1867
 , a battleship in service from 1882 to 1909
 , one of the first dreadnought battleships, in action at Jutland, and sold for breaking up in 1922
 , the shore establishment of this name was formed in 1940 as an entry camp for new recruits. Since World War II it has housed a number of Royal Navy training units.

References
 
 

Royal Navy ship names